Dewey Lee Yoder Jr (born July 18, 1930) is an American hurdler, known as Lee Yoder. Yoder attended Mercersburg Academy as a youth, where he trained under Jimmy Curran. He came second in the 400 metres hurdles at the 1952 US Olympic trials, beaten only by eventual gold medalist Charles Moore (also from Mercersburg). He competed in the 400 metres hurdles at the 1952 Summer Olympics.

Running for the University of Arkansas, Yoder finished second at the 1952 NCAA Track and Field Championships behind Bob Diviney from Kansas.  Yoder later played field hockey, including as part of the bronze medal winning American team at the 1967 Pan American Games.  He was manager for the United States field hockey team at the 1984 Olympics.

References

External links
 

1930 births
Living people
Arkansas Razorbacks men's track and field athletes
Mercersburg Academy alumni
Athletes (track and field) at the 1952 Summer Olympics
American male hurdlers
Olympic track and field athletes of the United States
American male field hockey players
Pan American Games medalists in field hockey
Pan American Games bronze medalists for the United States
Track and field athletes from Philadelphia
Field hockey players at the 1967 Pan American Games
American Olympic coaches
Medalists at the 1967 Pan American Games